Isoetales, sometimes also written Isoëtales, is an order of plants in the class Lycopodiopsida.

There are about 140-150 living species, all of which are classified in the genus Isoetes (quillworts), with a cosmopolitan distribution, but often scarce to rare. Living species are mostly aquatic or semi-aquatic, and are found in clear ponds and slowly moving streams. Each leaf is slender and broadens downward to a swollen base up to 5 mm wide where the leaves attach in clusters to a bulb-like, underground corm characteristic of most quillworts. This swollen base also contains male and female sporangia, protected by a thin, transparent covering (velum), which is used diagnostically to help identify quillwort species. Quillwort species are very difficult to distinguish by general appearance. The best way to identify them is by examining the megaspores under a microscope.

Isoetes are the only living pteridophytes capable of secondary growth.

Fossils
Fossilised specimens of Isoetes beestonii have been found in rocks dating to the latest Permian-earliest Triassic. The oldest fossil closely resembling modern quillworts is Isoetites rolandii from the Late Jurassic of North America.

All quillworts and their extinct relatives are heterosporous. Some fossil species are very well known, with many stages of development and the life cycle preserved. Two of the best known are the Carboniferous Chaloneria and Cretaceous Nathorstiana.

During the Early Triassic, Isoetales, such as the long-stemmed Pleuromeia were dominant over large areas of the globe.

Some authors include the "aboresecent lycophytes", often assigned to their own order, Lepidodendrales, within Isoetales.

References

External links
 
 World list of all species in order Isoetales from World Ferns by M. Hassler in the Catalogue of Life, 203 species.
 

Lycophytes
Plant orders